Walls of Jericho is the debut full-length studio album by German power metal band Helloween, released in 1985 on LP by Noise Records. It is the only album featuring Kai Hansen as lead vocalist until 2021's Helloween, although he would continue to act as guitarist on the two following albums.

In 1988, Walls of Jericho was released on CD. Due to the enhanced capacity of the CD, the Helloween EP/mini-LP and the song "Judas" from the Judas EP were added to the Walls of Jericho track listing; they are now released as a compilation. In the late 1980s, due to a manufacturing error, side one of several cassette copies of Walls of Jericho accidentally contained the music of Celtic Frost's To Mega Therion, confusing many first-time Helloween listeners.

Track listings

Original Edition

1987 CD Edition

2006 Remastered & Expanded Edition
Disc one is the same as above.

Tracks 1 & 2 also appear on the album Treasure Chest
Tracks 3 & 4 also appear on the Judas EP
Tracks 5 & 6 also appear on the Death Metal compilation
Track 7 also appears on the Helloween EP

Notes
The second pressing of an unofficial 1991 cassette release by MG Records comes with a yellow top right corner, a pink stripe in the top right corner, a pink spine, and a pink/black label logo on the front cover. The third pressing in 1992 comes with a blue top right corner, a yellow stripe in the top right corner, a pink background on the front cover, and a black band logo on the front cover
An unofficial 1991 cassette release by Tact adds the song "Starlight"
An unofficial 1993 cassette release by Euro Star adds the song "Judas". The second pressing comes with a green background behind the tracklist, green border around the album art, the band name in green, and the album title in blue
The track list on the back cover of the 1993 CD release by Futurist lists "Walls of Jericho" and "Ride the Sky" as separate tracks instead of the actual CD where they are joint
An unofficial 1997 cassette release by Audio Max excludes "Heavy Metal (Is the Law)" and "Judas"
The track list on the back cover of the 1997 re-release by Noise Records is incorrect, which lists "Walls of Jericho" and "Ride the Sky" as joint songs
An unofficial 2001 CD release by Agat Company contains the 1987 album Keeper of the Seven Keys: Part I
The 2002 release by Sauron Music has the lyrics in Korean

Personnel

Band members
Kai Hansen – vocals, guitar
Michael Weikath – guitar, cover concept
Markus Grosskopf – bass
Ingo Schwichtenberg – drums

Additional musicians
James Hardway – E-mu Emulator II

Production
Produced, engineered and mixed by Harris Johns
Edda and Uwe Karczewski – Cover design
Peter Vahlefeld – Layout, typography

Charts

Trivia
The titular entity in the song "Gorgar" is the first talking pinball machine ever produced.
The main theme of Edvard Grieg's "In the Hall of the Mountain King" is used in the song "Gorgar."
The intro to "Starlight" is taken from a commercial in the movie Halloween III: Season of the Witch.
The song "Heavy Metal (Is the Law)" is not an official live recording. Rather, crowd noise was added.
The live versions of "Ride the Sky" and "Guardians" are not live recordings; they are the same songs as found on Walls of Jericho but with crowd noise mixed in. The actual live versions of the two songs appeared only on the original 12" vinyl edition of the "Judas" single. 
Professional wrestler Chris Jericho took his ring name and the name of his submission maneuver from the title of this album.

References

External links
 Helloween's official website

Helloween albums
1985 debut albums
Noise Records albums
Albums produced by Harris Johns